Liam Coombes-Fabling (born 7 July 1998) is a New Zealand rugby union player who plays for  in the National Provincial Championship (NPC). His playing position is wing.

Early life
Coombes-Fabling attended St. John's College, Hamilton.

Rugby career
Coombes-Fabling played for the  under-19s team at the Jock Hobbs Memorial Tournament in 2017. Playing at first five-eighth, Coombes-Fabling lead Waikato to the final; they would go on to lose 30–17 in the final against .

He scored 3 tries in the 2020 season. On 24 September 2021, Coombes-Fabling scored two tries in a winning effort against  which moved Waikato to the top of the NPC Premiership Division standings. On 1 October he scored a hat-trick in a 38–28 loss against .

Reference list

External links
Itsrugby.co.uk profile

New Zealand rugby union players
Living people
Rugby union wings
Waikato rugby union players
People educated at St John's College, Hamilton
Rugby union players from Hamilton, New Zealand
1998 births
Rugby union fly-halves
Highlanders (rugby union) players
Chiefs (rugby union) players